Le Amiche (lit. "The girlfriends") is a 1955 Italian drama film directed by Michelangelo Antonioni and starring Eleonora Rossi Drago, Gabriele Ferzetti, Franco Fabrizi, and Valentina Cortese. Based on Cesare Pavese's 1949 novella Tra donne sole (lit. "Only among women"), Le Amiche portrays a group of five upper-class women in Turin and their various relationships with men. It premiered at the Venice Film Festival where it was awarded the Silver Lion.

Plot
Clelia returns from Rome to her native city Turin, assigned to supervise the opening of a branch of the Roman fashion salon where she previously has been working. By coincidence, she is confronted with the suicide attempt of a young woman named Rosetta and gets acquainted with her circle of Turin socialites. The group includes Rosetta, the coquettish Mariella, Momina, who lives separated from her husband and has changing affairs, and successful ceramics artist Nene, who lives with Lorenzo, an unrecognised painter. The construction work on the salon, whose opening lies only a few days ahead, is not finished yet, for which Clelia scolds Cesare, the architect in charge, who turns out to be Momina's present affair. During her inspection, Clelia also meets Cesare's assistant Carlo. Although she feels attracted to him, she is soon confronted with the social boundaries between Carlo, who is of working class descent, and herself, regardless of the fact that Clelia grew up in one of Turin's poor quarters as well.

After Rosetta's return from the hospital, the five women, Cesare and Lorenzo take a trip to the beach. It becomes evident that Rosetta has fallen in love with Nene's partner Lorenzo, for whom she modeled and whom she had tried to ring up on the night of her suicide attempt. Rosetta tells Clelia of her inner emptiness and that she loathes the predictability which surrounds her. Clelia offers Rosetta a job at the salon as a means to find a different perspective on her life.

Rosetta tries to talk Lorenzo into leaving Nene for her, but Lorenzo remains hesitant. Eager to spend every moment possible with her lover, she decides against the opportunity to work at Clelia's salon. During the opening event, Nene, who has sensed the attraction between Rosetta and Lorenzo, offers Rosetta to let him go. When the group later meets in a restaurant, Cesare mocks Lorenzo for his lack of artistic success, and the two men get into a fight. Rosetta follows Lorenzo, who tells her that he cannot give her the love she seeks from him. Lorenzo returns to Nene, who eventually accepts him back, even if it means giving up the chance to go to New York for an exhibition of her work. 

Soon after, Rosetta drowns herself in the Po river. Disgusted by Momina's self-righteousness in the face of her friend's death, Clelia attacks her for her coldness and cynism in front of the salon customers and her employer. Convinced that she will lose her job, Clelia hints at Carlo the possibility of a relationship, but when her employer offers her to return to the salon in Rome, she chooses her professional career and independence over the prospect of becoming, in her words, "a peaceful wife in a modest home". She asks him to meet her one last time, but Carlo does not show up, instead secretly watching her departure on the train to Rome.

Cast
 Eleonora Rossi Drago as Clelia
 Gabriele Ferzetti as Lorenzo
 Franco Fabrizi as Cesare
 Valentina Cortese as Nene
 Yvonne Furneaux as Momina
 Madeleine Fischer as Rosetta
 Anna Maria Pancani as Mariella
 Luciano Volpato as Tony
 Maria Gambarelli as Clelia's employer
 Ettore Manni as Carlo

Production and release
Antonioni adapted the screenplay from Pavese's novella in collaboration with Suso Cecchi d'Amico and Alba de Céspedes, assigning the dramaturgy to d'Amico and the dialogue to Céspedes. Alterations from the literary source include the narrative perspective, which is solely Clelia's in the novella, other than the film's multiple viewpoints, and the motive of Rosetta's suicide, which is ascribed to a luckless lesbian affair with Momina and a general feeling of senselessness in Pavese's book, while the  ill-fated affair with Lorenzo serves as explanation in the adaptation. The film was shot on location in Turin, produced by the Trionfalcine production company, Rome. The women's wardrobe was designed by the Roman fashion house Sorelle Fontana.

Le Amiche premiered at the Venice Film Festival on 7 September 1955 and was distributed in Italy through Titanus. The film did respectably well at the box office; two years later, it premiered in Paris with critical support by Positif magazine. In the US, it was not shown before Antonioni had established himself as a filmmaker of international prominence with L'Avventura (1960).

On the film's initial run, some critics, as novelist Alberto Moravia, commented on Antonioni's approach to his material as being restrained. Nowadays, the majority of critics regard Le Amiche as an important early work by the director, which foreshadows themes again explored in his later films, in L'Avventura in particular, such as the lack of emotional connection between the protagonists and the emptiness within them.

Awards
 1955: Venice Film Festival – Silver Lion
 1956: Italian National Syndicate of Film Journalists – Silver Ribbon Award for Best Director (Michelangelo Antonioni)
 1956: Italian National Syndicate of Film Journalists – Silver Ribbon Award for Best Supporting Actress (Valentina Cortese)

Notes

References

External links
 
 
 
 

1955 films
1955 drama films
Films about suicide
Films directed by Michelangelo Antonioni
Films set in Italy
Films set in Turin
Italian black-and-white films
Italian drama films
1950s Italian-language films
Films with screenplays by Suso Cecchi d'Amico
Titanus films
Films scored by Giovanni Fusco
1950s Italian films